Aqajan (also Romanized as Āqājān; also known as Āqājānī) is a village in Bazvand Rural District, Central District, Rumeshkhan County, Lorestan Province, Iran. At the 2006 census, its population was 2,358, in 467 families.

References 

Populated places in Rumeshkhan County